Thyagam is a 1978 Indian Tamil-language drama film released starring Sivaji Ganesan and Lakshmi. It is a remake of the 1975 Hindi film Amanush. Upon released the film was a blockbuster and highest-grossing Tamil film of the year.

Plot 
Raja and Radha are lovers. Raja is a rich man who has now fallen into depths of despair and poverty due to machinations of Ramasamy who was their accountant. He has taken over the family property after sending Raja to prison under fake rape and murder charges. Radha too has left him. Inspector Prasanth joins duty and strikes an odd friendship with Raja after initial skirmishes. 

He rehabilitates Raja, who is an engineer by education, by giving him a civil contract for construction of a bridge. Life seems to turn for the better until Ramasamy finds out that the inspector is now reinvestigating the fake charges. He attempts to destroy the bridge, damage Raja and Prasanth's name and save himself. Does he succeed or does Raja manage to redeem himself?

Cast 
Sivaji Ganesan as Raja / Rajasekaran
Lakshmi as Radha
K. Balaji as Inspector Prasanth
Major Sundarrajan
V. K. Ramasamy
M. R. R. Vasu
Nagesh
Thengai Srinivasan
Manorama
A. Karunanidhi
Junior Balaiah
Mukkamala
Fatafat Jayalakshmi

Soundtrack 
The music was scored by Ilaiyaraaja and the lyrics were written by Kannadasan.

References

External links 
 

1970s Tamil-language films
1978 drama films
1978 films
Films directed by K. Vijayan
Films scored by Ilaiyaraaja
Indian drama films
Tamil remakes of Hindi films
Films based on works by Shaktipada Rajguru